Mona Vale may refer to:

 Mona Vale, New South Wales, a suburb in northern Sydney
 Mona Vale Hospital, a district hospital located in Mona Vale
 Mona Vale Road, part of Metroad 3 in Sydney
 Mona Vale, Christchurch, a public park in Christchurch, New Zealand
 Mona Vale, Tasmania, a country estate in Tasmania.